The 2023 Judo Grand Slam Paris was held at the Accor Arena in Paris, France, from 4 to 5 February 2023 as part of the IJF World Tour and during the 2024 Summer Olympics qualification period.

Medal summary

Men's events

Women's events

Source results:

Medal table

Prize money
The sums written are per medalist, bringing the total prizes awarded to 154,000€.

References

External links
 

2023 Judo Grand Slam
2023 IJF World Tour
Judo
Grand Slam Paris 2023
Judo
Judo